Mussel Inlet is in inlet in the North Coast region of the Canadian province of British Columbia. It is a northeast extension of Sheep Passage, and part of the Fiordland Conservancy.

Name origin and history
It was first charted in 1793 by James Johnstone, one of George Vancouver's officers during his 1791-95 expedition. Poison Cove at  being the location where the mussels were harvested. A creek northwest into that cove is Poison Cove Creek.

References

Inlets of British Columbia
North Coast of British Columbia